Judith Hubback (born Eläis Judith Fischer Williams; 23 February 1917 – 6 January 2006) was a British analytical psychologist and sociologist noted for her early studies into women and work.

Early life and family 
Eläis Judith Fischer Williams was born on 23 February 1917, the third daughter of the international lawyer Sir John Fischer Williams, CBE, KC (1870–1947) and his wife, the artist Eleanor Marjorie Hay Murray (1880–1961). Her elder sister was the historian and civil servant Jenifer Margaret Hart (also the wife of H. L. A. Hart). Judith grew up in Paris and learnt to speak French fluently. She studied at Newnham College, Cambridge, graduating in 1936 with a first-class honours degree (BA) in history. While there, she met David Hubback (died 1991), the son of Eva Hubback, and they married in 1939; the couple went on to have one son and two daughters.

Career

Teaching, married life and social studies 
Hubback was a teacher until her first child was born; even then she had faced discrimination while applying for teaching posts as a married woman, and she was frustrated that she could not even indulge in details of her husband's work (he was a civil servant and could not talk about his confidential work with her). With the end of the Second World War, employment opportunities for women (which had been substantially expanded to meet wartime demands) contracted; the social expectations that women would become full-time mothers once they had children also acted as a cultural barrier to employment. In the late 1940s, Judith Hubback became aware of her mother-in-law, Eva Hubback's, social studies on working-class housewives and took an interest in replies to her surveys. She became increasingly interested in women's attitudes towards work and self-funded her own postal surveys as part of a project to explore the lives of highly educated, married women in Britain. She published the results of her surveys in 1954 as a pamphlet, Graduate Wives, which attracted coverage in national newspapers. She followed it up in 1957 with a much more substantial book: Wives Who Went to College, described by The Guardian as "considerably ahead of its time".

In the words of the historian Helen McCarthy, Hubback was one of a number of researchers in the 1950s (such as Viola Klein, Pearl Jephcott, Ferdynand Zweig, Nancy Seear and Hannah Gavron) who "helped to entrench new understandings of married women’s employment as a fundamental feature of advanced industrial societies, and one that solved the dilemmas of ‘modern’ woman across social classes." She reported the frustrations of highly qualified women who felt constrained to stop working once they married or to care for their children; she concluded that women who sacrificed themselves and their capacity for self-actualisation to become full-time mothers and wives instead were "often too self-sacrificing in the sense that they let themselves drift into a state of mind in which their daily lives gradually destroy them as individuals". Hubback argued that women could balance motherhood, marriage and work only through the full support of their husbands. Wives Who Went to College was the subject of much discussion: it received 87 reviews in published material and was the subject of leading articles in The Times and The Economist.

Analytical psychology and later life 
Despite her work (which included freelance broadcasting and journalism), she continued to feel deeply unsatisfied with aspects of her life: "she was unsatisfied and sometimes depressed, knowing that she had unrealised potential." She visited Robert Hobson, a Jungian psychoanalyst, and became sufficiently interested in the subject that she qualified with the Society of Analytical Psychology in 1964; she was heavily involved with the Society, serving as its Honorary Secretary for a time, as co-editor of the Journal of Analytical Psychology (1976–85) and as the Society's representative on the committee of the International Association for Analytical Psychology (1986–92).

Judith Hubback died on 6 February 2006, her husband having predeceased her, and was survived by her three children. She donated her papers to the Women's Library Archive at the London School of Economics in 1997 (they are catalogued as GB 106 7JUH).

BBC TV appearance
Judith Hubback was a contributor to a BBC-TV programme, entitled "The Meaning of Dreams", presented by comedian and naturalist Bill Oddie, which aired on 16 April 1986.

Publications 
Hubback published her professional papers in 1988 as:
 People Who Do Things to Each Other

Her literary output includes:
 Islands and People (1964), containing poetry
 The Sea Has Many Voices (1990), a novel which received the Society of Authors' Sagittarius prize in 1991. 
 From Dawn to Dusk (2003), an autobiography

References 

1917 births
2006 deaths
British psychoanalysts
Jungian psychologists
British women writers
British women academics
British sociologists
Family sociologists
British women sociologists
20th-century British women scientists